Coles Branch is a  long tributary to Crabtree Creek in Wake County, North Carolina and is classed as a 2nd order stream on the EPA waters geoviewer site.

Course
Coles Branch rises in a pond in western Cary, North Carolina, and then flows northwest to Crabtree Creek.  It is a developed watershed with only 7% of the watershed considered to be forested.

Watershed
Coles Branch drains  of area in the western part of Cary, North Carolina.  Coles Branch is underlaid by the Deep River Basin.    The watershed receives an average of 46.4 in/year of precipitation and has a wetness index of 413.95.

References

Rivers of North Carolina
Rivers of Wake County, North Carolina
Tributaries of Pamlico Sound